David Fretz is a Canadian retired ice hockey defenseman who was a two-time All-American for Clarkson.

Career
Fretz began attending Clarkson University in he fall of 1981 and quickly became a mainstay on the blueline. He would lead the defensive corps in scoring in three of his four seasons with the Golden Knights and help the team post three 20+ win seasons in his time. Prior to his junior season, Fretz joined Team Canada in their run up to the 1984 Winter Olympics but was not retained for the competition. He did, however, help the team win the 1984 Spengler Cup, the first for Canada in the 58 years of the series. 

In his third collegiate season, he helped the team to its best postseason finish in eleven year in 1984 and was named an All-American that season. He was an alternate captain for his senior season and ended his playing career upon his graduation. He was inducted into the Clarkson Athletic Hall of Fame in 2004 and was named to the ECAC Hockey All-decade team.

Statistics

Regular season and playoffs

International

Awards and honors

References

External links

1962 births
Living people
AHCA Division I men's ice hockey All-Americans
American men's ice hockey defensemen
Clarkson Golden Knights men's ice hockey players
Ice hockey people from Toronto